Marie-Ange Todorovitch is a contemporary French mezzo-soprano born in Montpellier.

Roles 
 2000: La Belle Hélène: Oreste, at the Théâtre du Châtelet in Paris
 2000: The Tales of Hoffmann: Giulietta, Grand Théâtre de Genève and Opéra de Monte-Carlo (2010) 
 2010: Louise: the mother, Opéra national du Rhin
 2010: L'Homme de la Mancha: Aldonza, Capitole de Toulouse
 2010: Der Fliegende Holländer: Mary, Opéra Bastille
 2010: Hamlet: la reine Gertrude, Opéra de Marseille and Strasbourg Opera House (2011)
 2011: Rigoletto: Maddalena, Opéra de Monte-Carlo and Chorégies d'Orange
 2011: Faust: dame Marthe, Opéra Bastille
 2011: La Chartreuse de Parme: Gina, Opéra de Marseille
 2014: Colomba (world premiere): Colomba, Opéra de Marseille, West pier (world premiere) Opéra du Rhin
 2015: Die Eroberung von Mexico (Salzburger Festpielhaus), Wozzeck (Margret), Scala de Milan

See also

References

External links 
 Personal website
 Marie-Ange Todorovitch on France Info
 Portrait on Forum Opéra
 Rencontre avec Marie-Ange Todorovitch on Opéra online
 Marie-Ange Todorovitch on Olyrix
 Marie-Ange Todorovitch on Opera Musica
 
 ELEKTRA Richard Strauss - Marie-Ange Todorovitch "Clytemnestre" on YouTube

Musicians from Montpellier
French operatic mezzo-sopranos
Year of birth missing (living people)
Living people
21st-century French women singers